Østerfælled Barracks, later known as , was a barracks originally built in the 1890s for the Guard Hussars of the Royal Danish Army in the emerging Østerbro district of Copenhagen, Denmark. Many of the old buildings have been retained while others have been demolished to make way for new residential buildings.

History

Østerfælled Barracks were designed by Eugen Jørgensen and built between 1897 and 1898 for the Guard Hussars, the light cavalry regiment of the Royal Danish Army. The facility was named after the site, the Eastern Commons, which had come under urban development after the decommissioning of Copenhagen's fortifications. The name of the facility was changed to  Barracks after the cavalry moved to Næstved in 1940.

After the end of the Second World War, the Air Force Regiment and 10th Artillery Department, until then based at  Barracks, took over the premises in November 1945. Later the Danish Defence Academy was based at the site.

A local plan for redevelopment of the grounds was drafted in 1992 and the area was subsequently acquired by the pension fund  (PBU) in 1993. Some of the old buildings were demolished to make way for new residential buildings. Others were converted into retail and commercial space.

Architecture
The gate is topped by King Frederick VII's monogram and flanked by two guardhouses with hipped roofs. The buildings are designed in a Neo-Baroque style and built in red brick with white window frames and Mansard Roofs with blue-glazed tiles.

See also
 Royal Horse Guards Barracks (Copenhagen)

References

External links

 Local plan No. 224 covering the area

Barracks in Copenhagen
Baroque Revival architecture in Copenhagen
Residential buildings completed in 1898